The Last Legion is a 2007 historical action adventure film directed by Doug Lefler and  produced by Dino De Laurentiis. It is based on the 2002 novel of the same name by Valerio Massimo Manfredi. It stars Colin Firth, Ben Kingsley, Aishwarya Rai, Thomas Brodie-Sangster, Peter Mullan, Kevin McKidd, John Hannah, and Iain Glen. It premiered in Abu Dhabi on 6 April 2007.

The film is loosely inspired by the events of 5th-century European history, notably the collapse of the Western Roman Empire. This is coupled with other facts and legends from the history of Britain and fantastic elements from the legend of King Arthur to provide a basis for the Arthurian legend.

Plot 
Shortly before the coronation of Romulus Augustulus as Emperor in AD 475, Ambrosinus, a Druid and part of a secret brotherhood protecting the sword of Julius Caesar, has become the tutor to the young Romulus Augustulus. He at times gives the impression he is a magician, but his "magic" is usually revealed to be simple hand trickery. Romulus' father Orestes rules Rome but is not Emperor himself. On the day before Romulus' coronation, Odoacer, commander of the barbarian Goths allied with Rome, demands a third of Italy from Orestes, but is rebuffed. The same day, Romulus meets the general of the Nova Invicta Legion, Aurelius.

The night after the coronation, Rome is attacked by the Goths in the Battle of Ravenna. Most of Aurelius' men are killed, and Aurelius is stunned and left for dead. Orestes and his wife are killed by Odoacer's lieutenant, Wulfila, who captures Romulus. The next day, Odoacer, now the ruler of the Western Roman Empire, plans to have Romulus killed. Ambrosinus convinces Odoacer to spare him and Romulus is exiled to Capri along with Ambrosinus, guarded by Wulfila and his men. His prison is a villa constructed more than four centuries earlier by the emperor Tiberius.

With Ambrosinus' help, Romulus discovers a hidden chamber within the villa. He comes across a statue of Julius Caesar holding his sword, forged by a Chalybian smith after his military campaigns in Britain. Writing near the statue's feet proclaims the sword was made for "he who is destined to rule". This is interpreted as a prophecy and Romulus keeps the weapon.

Ambrosinus and Romulus are rescued from Capri by Aurelius and three surviving legionaries, Vatrenus, Batiatus and Demetrius, accompanied by Mira, a female Indian agent of the Eastern Roman Empire. They take Romulus to a seaport where the Eastern Roman Empire has promised safe passage to Constantinople. They barely escape after they learn the Senate and the Eastern Empire have betrayed them and sided with Odoacer.

Ambrosinus persuades Romulus to seek refuge in Britain, where the Legio IX Hispana (Ninth Legion) may remain loyal, being far from the events. They are followed by Wulfila and the Goths, who covet Caesar's sword after learning of the prophecy. Crossing the Alps and the English Channel, the party travels to Hadrian's Wall and initially find no evidence of the legion until a farmer reveals he used to be its commanding general. With the collapse of Roman support of Britain, the legion had decided to disband and settle as farmers. Most of the men in the legion had married and had families and did not want to antagonise the region's powerful warlord, Vortgyn. During their stay in the small Celtic village, Romulus meets and befriends a young girl named Igraine, who is unaware of Romulus' true identity.

Vortgyn, revealed to be an old enemy of Ambrosinus, desires Caesar's sword as he aspires to rule the whole of Britain and he allies with the Goths. Vortgyn confronts Igraine outside the village and makes her tell the village to surrender Romulus, killing the village blacksmith's family in a show of force. When Igraine tells the villagers of what has happened, Aurelius confesses that Romulus is the Roman emperor. The blacksmith demands revenge for his family, and Aurelius and his men decide to lead an army to Hadrian's Wall to face Vortgyn's armies in a final battle.

Before leaving the village, Igraine gives Romulus a suit of Roman armour which belonged to her brother, which he has since outgrown. At Hadrian's Wall, Aurelius, wielding Caesar's sword, leads his men and a group of Celtic warriors against Vortgyn's forces. Vortgyn's forces begin to overwhelm Romulus' forces until the rest of the Ninth Legion, having taken up their old Roman arms and uniforms, arrive to help. The two warring sides cease their hostilities upon seeing Ambrosinus holding Vortgyn's golden mask, after burning him alive at a sanctuary of his secret brotherhood. After having fought and severely injured Aurelius, Wulfila is confronted by Romulus, who stabs Wulfila in the chest with Caesar's sword, killing him. Repulsed by the deaths in the battle, Romulus disposes of his sword, lodging it in a large stone.

Many years later, Ambrosinus, now known by his Druid name, Merlin, takes a young boy to the battlefield to describe the legendary events. Merlin, who seems to have aged little since the battle, says that Aurelius married Mira and the two raised Romulus as their own son. He became a wise ruler, took Igraine as his wife and adopted the name "Pendragon". The boy, Arthur, recognises Romulus as his father and Igraine as his mother. In a final scene, Caesar's sword is shown embedded in the stone, covering the original Latin inscription, now only reading "E S CALIBVR".

Cast

 Colin Firth as Aurelianus Ambrosius
 Thomas Brodie-Sangster as Romulus Augustulus / Pendragon
 Ben Kingsley as Ambrosinus / Merlin
 Aishwarya Rai as Mira
 Peter Mullan as Odoacer
 Kevin McKidd as Wulfila
 John Hannah as Nestor
 Owen Teale as Vatrenus
 Rupert Friend as Demetrius
 Nonso Anozie as Batiatus
 Harry Van Gorkum as Vortgyn
 Robert Pugh as Kustennin
 James Cosmo as Hrothgar
 Alexander Siddig as Theodorus Andronikos
 Murray McArthur as Tertius
 Iain Glen as Orestes
 Rory Finn as Young Arthur
 Alexandra Thomas-Davies as Ygraine
 Ferdinand Kingsley as Young Ambrosinus

Production notes
The film's producers include Dino De Laurentiis, Martha, his second wife, and Raffaella, his daughter by his first wife. Raffaella suggested director Doug Lefler due to his work on Dragonheart: A New Beginning, which she produced. Filming took place in Tunisia and at Spiš Castle in eastern Slovakia in 2005.

Valerio Massimo Manfredi helped adapt his novel to the screen. In an interview, he states at least four hours of footage was shot but ultimately shortened or cut, including scenes of the heroes' journey through the Alps and the English Channel.

For the role of Aurelius, executive producer Harvey Weinstein suggested Colin Firth, known for playing Fitzwilliam Darcy in Pride and Prejudice (1995) and more recently, Mark Darcy in the Bridget Jones films. Firth accepted the role due to the story, which he liked, and that it was very different from previous roles.

Thomas Sangster (Romulus) was one of the last to be cast. He had previously worked with Firth in Love Actually (2003) and Nanny McPhee (2006), and their familiarity with each other benefited both.

Sir Ben Kingsley was cast as Ambrosinus/Merlin after one meeting with Lefler. Kingsley was drawn to the mystique of the character, whom Lefler describes as a "warrior shaman". Kingsley also found the story interesting.

Aishwarya Rai was cast as Mira after the filmmakers decided "somebody that had a rare beauty... who could move very well", in Lefler's words, was ideal for the role. Lefler touted Rai's training in dance as an asset for her fight scenes. Like Firth, Rai took the role as a change of pace from her previous work.

The film's costumes were designed by Paolo Scalabrino, who had worked on Gangs of New York and Troy.

Lefler wanted each character to have a unique fighting style. Richard Ryan served as the film's sword master, helping him plan the fight scenes; he had worked on Troy and would work on Stardust as such.

The film's score was composed by Patrick Doyle.

Reception
, the film had an average score of 37 out of 100 on Metacritic based on 12 reviews. On Rotten Tomatoes, the film holds a 15% approval rating, based on 55 reviews with an average rating of 4.02/10. The site's consensus reads, "With miscast leads and unoriginal, uninspired dialogue, The Last Legion pales in comparison to the recent cinematic epics it invokes."

See also
List of historical drama films
List of films set in ancient Rome
Late Antiquity
Battle of Mons Badonicus
Anglo-Saxon settlement of Britain

References

External links 

The Last Legion Production Information

2007 films
2000s historical adventure films
2000s action war films
Arthurian films
British historical adventure films
British action war films
English-language French films
English-language Italian films
Fiction set in Roman Britain
Films scored by Patrick Doyle
Films about death
Films about orphans
2000s historical action films
Films based on adventure novels
Films based on Italian novels
Films based on European myths and legends
Films set in ancient Rome
Films set in classical antiquity
Films set in the 5th century
Films set in the Roman Empire
Films shot in Slovakia
Films produced by Dino De Laurentiis
Films produced by Martha De Laurentiis
Films produced by Raffaella De Laurentiis
French historical adventure films
French war films
Italian historical adventure films
Kalarippayattu films
Secret histories
Romulus Augustulus
Films with screenplays by Jez Butterworth
2007 martial arts films
Films directed by Doug Lefler
2000s English-language films
2000s British films
2000s French films